Seven and a Half (Persian: هفت و نیم, romanized: Hafto-Nim) is a 2019 Iranian drama film directed and written by Navid Mahmoudi and produced by Jamshid Mahmoudi. The film screened for the first time at the 24th Busan International Film Festival.

Premise 
The film tells the story of the lives of seven Afghan and Iranian girls in seven episodes in a sequence of plots, and is the story of girls whose wedding is scheduled to take place on Friday night, but each of whom is involved in some way.

Cast 
''Shabaneh'' Episode

 Neda Jebraeili as Shabaneh
 Shadi Mokhtari as Hediyeh
 Atieh Javid as Ms. Saleh

''Negar'' Episode

 Hasti Mahdavifar as Negar
 Mohammad Reza Ghaffari as Mehrab

''Fereshteh'' Episode

 Fereshteh Hosseini as Fereshteh
 Hossein Mehri as Behzad
 Roya Javidnia as Doctor

''Niloufar'' Episode

 Sheida Khaligh as Niloufar
 Alireza Ostadi as Niloufar's Father

''Nahid'' Episode

 Anahita Afshar as Nahid
 Alireza Kamali Nejad as Salar

''Rahil'' Episode

 Afsaneh Kamali as Rahil
 Zahra Behrouzmanesh as Somayeh
 Mahsa Hemati as Emergency Doctor

''Shekar'' Episode

 Matin Heydarinia as Saeed
 Rozhan Taghi Zadeh as Mina

References

External links 
 
 

2019 films
2019 drama films
2010s Persian-language films
Iranian drama films